Cannonball in Europe! is a live album by jazz saxophonist Cannonball Adderley recorded at the Comblain-la-Tour in Belgium and released on the Capitol label featuring performances by Adderley with Nat Adderley, Yusef Lateef, Joe Zawinul, Sam Jones and Louis Hayes.

Reception

The Penguin Guide to Jazz states "Bringing in Joe Zawinul and Yusef Lateef energised the band anew but Lateef's touches of exotica are an awkward match for the sunnier disposition of the customary material, Nevertheless Nippon Soul and In Europe are perhaps the best of this bunch". The Allmusic review by Al Campbell awarded the album 4 stars and states "Cannonball Adderley is in excellent form on this live date".

Track listing 
 "P. Bouk" (Yusef Lateef) – 10:23  
 A Few Words from Cannonball – 1:00  
 "Gemini" (Jimmy Heath) – 12:45  
 "Work Song" (Nat Adderley) – 8:25  
 More Words from Cannonball – 0:22  
 "Trouble in Mind" (Richard M. Jones) – 10:19  
 "Dizzy's Business" (Ernie Wilkins) – 7:38 
Recorded at the Comblain-la-Tour, Belgium, on August 4 & 5, 1962

Personnel 
 Cannonball Adderley – alto saxophone
 Nat Adderley – cornet
 Yusef Lateef – tenor saxophone, flute, oboe
 Joe Zawinul – piano
 Sam Jones – bass
 Louis Hayes – drums

References 

1962 live albums
Cannonball Adderley live albums
Capitol Records live albums